Osama Musa Al-Aoun (Arabic:أسامه موسى العون) (born 8 December 1986) is a Qatari footballer. He currently plays for Al Bidda as a midfielder .

Career
He formerly played for Al-Kharaitiyat, El Jaish, Al-Khor, Al-Shamal, Mesaimeer, Al-Markhiya, Muaither, and Al Bidda.

External links

References

Living people
1986 births
Qatari footballers
Al Kharaitiyat SC players
El Jaish SC players
Al-Khor SC players
Al-Shamal SC players
Mesaimeer SC players
Al-Markhiya SC players
Muaither SC players
Al Bidda SC players
Qatar Stars League players
Qatari Second Division players
Association football midfielders
Place of birth missing (living people)